Lament is the twelfth and last studio album of original material, from American Christian rock band Resurrection Band, released in 1995. The band also reverted to their original moniker with this album.

Recording history
Concerned that they had fallen into a rut musically, Resurrection Band decided to reach outside the band for inspiration, finding it in producer Ty Tabor, guitarist and co-lead vocalist for the band King's X. However, the most radical departure from prior releases was not so much the style of music—the blues-based hard rock of latter-period REZ is still here in evidence—but the approach to the material.  Lament is the band's first concept album, a song cycle about one man's disillusionment with the harshness and cruelty of life and his eventual realization that things will not change without his own spiritual redemption.  As the band's final album of original material, it is a fitting swan song, given that Resurrection Band's entire reason for existence was to inspire listeners to seriously consider their own spiritual condition and their need for a Savior.

Recognizing the importance of how the songs are ordered, Resurrection Band played the entire album from beginning to end on the tour which supported this album, which was rare enough in rock music—save for The Who, Pink Floyd, Iron Maiden and Styx—and unheard of in Christian rock.  As a result, the creative rebirth of Lament was highly praised among long-time fans of Resurrection Band as well as prominent Christian music critics, with some calling the album the finest the band ever recorded.

Track listing

Personnel

 Glenn Kaiser – acoustic and electric guitars, dulcimer, harmonica, lead and background vocals
 Wendi Kaiser – lead and background vocals
 Stu Heiss – electric and acoustic guitars, keyboards
 Roy Montroy – bass guitar, background vocals
 John Herrin – drums
 Roger Heiss – percussion
 Ed Bialach – percussion
 Ty Tabor – lead guitar, acoustic guitar, producer, engineer
 Chris Cameron – organ
 Hilde Bialach – cello
 Julie M. Andrews – background vocals
 Diane Borden – background vocals
 Eric Clayton – pan pipes
 Colleen Davick – background vocals
 Shelli Friede – background vocals
 Chris Garno – background vocals
 Micky Griffin – background vocals
 Bonnie Groth – background vocals
 Laurel Heiss – background vocals
 Lottie Jones – background vocals
 Caryl Montroy – background vocals
 Andrea Spicer – background vocals

 Additional production'
 Tom Cameron – executive producer
 Brian Garcia – engineer
 Roger Heiss – engineer
 Ed Bialach – assistant to engineer
 Marty Phillips – assistant to engineer

References

Resurrection Band albums
Concept albums
1995 albums